Clemensia domica is a moth of the family Erebidae first described by Herbert Druce. It is found in Ecuador.

References

Cisthenina